Forum was a centrist, liberal political party in Spain, founded in 1991 by Eduard Punset.

References

1991 establishments in Spain
1995 disestablishments in Spain
Centrist parties in Spain
Defunct political parties in Spain
Defunct liberal political parties
Liberal parties in Spain
Political parties disestablished in 1995
Political parties established in 1991